The presence of Dominicans in Italy dates back after 1990s and most of them were married to Italian citizens.

Numbers

In 2014 in Italy there are 28,804 regular immigrants from Dominican Republic. In 2006 there were 17,892. The three cities with most number of Dominicans are: La Spezia, Rome and Milan.

Notable Dominicans in Italy

See also

 Dominican Republic
 Dominican Republic–Italy relations

References

Notes

Caribbean diaspora in Italy
Ethnic groups in Italy
Italy
Immigration to Italy